The Equidome is a 3,500-seat indoor arena located at the Los Angeles Equestrian Center complex, located next to the Los Angeles River on Riverside Drive in Burbank, Los Angeles County, California.

Overview
The equestrian center complex is within Griffith Park, in a separate small section across the Los Angeles River from the main park area and the Los Angeles Zoo.

The Equidome was built in 1982, and is used for sporting events such as equestrian shows, dressage competitions, and rodeos. It is occasionally used for music concerts.  The arena has  of floor space.

Annual events
Annual events held in the Equidome include:
"Equestfest" — held by the  Pasadena Tournament of Roses at year's end to showcase the equestrian participants of the Rose Parade, prior to their parade participation on New Year's Day.
"Fiesta of the Spanish Horse" — an equestrian show to raise awareness and funds for cancer research.

References

External links
Los Angeles Equestrian Center website
Los Angeles Equestrian Center: image of the Equidome
Fiesta of the Spanish Horse at the Equidome website

Equestrian venues in the United States
Buildings and structures in Burbank, California
Indoor arenas in California
Sports venues in Los Angeles County, California
Sports venues completed in 1982
1982 establishments in California
Sports venues in California
Tourist attractions in Los Angeles County, California